The 1536 Compendium Competorum was a document listing clerical abuses by the Roman Catholic Church in England and Wales. It was used by Henry VIII of England to give religious justification to the dissolution of the monasteries during the English Reformation.

English Reformation
History of Catholicism in England